Brian James Adam (10 June 1948 – 25 April 2013) was a Scottish politician and biochemist who served as Minister for Parliamentary Business and Chief Whip from 2011 to 2012. A member of the Scottish National Party (SNP), he was a Member of the Scottish Parliament (MSP) from 1999 to 2013.

He was an MSP for the North East Scotland region from 1999 to 2003, then for the Aberdeen North constituency from 2003 to 2011, and for the Aberdeen Donside constituency from 2011 until his death in 2013. From 2007 to 2011, he was Chief Whip for the minority SNP Government and Co-Convener of the Oil and Gas Cross Party Group.

Early life

Education and career 
Brian James Adam was born on 10 June 1948 in Newmill, Moray. He attended Keith Grammar School and obtained a BSc (Hons) in Biochemistry and a MSc in Clinical Pharmacology from the University of Aberdeen. 

He began his career with Glaxo in Montrose, Angus from 1970 to 1973, before working as a biochemist at City Hospital, Aberdeen from 1973 to 1988. From 1988, Adam worked as the principal biochemist in the National Health Service at Aberdeen Royal Infirmary.

Early political years 
Adam joined the Scottish National Party (SNP) in 1974 and he was a trade union activist prior to his election to Holyrood in 1999. He served three terms as a councillor for Middlefield and Heathryfold on Aberdeen District Council from 1988 to 1996 and on Aberdeen City Council from 1995 until 1999.

He stood as a candidate for the Aberdeen North constituency at the 1997 general election for the House of Commons but Labour retained the seat with a majority of 10,000 votes.

Member of the Scottish Parliament 
In the first election to the Scottish Parliament in 1999, he contested Aberdeen North. Labour won the seat with a narrow majority of just 398 votes. Adam was elected from the regional list as the second North East Scotland regional MSP in 1999.

At the 2003 election he stood for the Aberdeen North constituency, this time winning the seat from Labour with a majority of 457 votes.

He retained the seat at the 2007 election with a significantly increased majority of 3,749 votes, and then again in 2011 in the renamed Aberdeen Donside with an even larger majority of 7,175 votes.

After struggling with a long illness, his death from cancer was announced on 25 April 2013. Then-First Minister Alex Salmond paid tribute to Adam as "an outstanding politician, fine human being and a dear friend."

Personal life 
Adam lived in Aberdeen with his wife Dorothy. He had five children and three grandchildren. He was an active member of the Church of Jesus Christ of Latter-day Saints (LDS Church). Adam was also follower of Aberdeen Football Club and attended the majority of their matches.

Spokesperson posts
 May 1999 to September 2000 – Deputy Whip
 September 2000 to April 2003 – Deputy Business Manager & Deputy Chief Whip
 May 2003 to September 2004 – Deputy Party Spokesperson on Education & Lifelong Learning
 September 2004 – Deputy Party Spokesperson on Tourism

Parliamentary posts
In June 2003 he became the Convener of the Standards Committee.
 May 2007 – Chief Whip
 May 2011 – September 2012 − Minister for Parliamentary Business and Chief Whip

See also 
Government of the 4th Scottish Parliament

References

External links 
Official Blog
 
They Work For You.com
The Public Whip Voting Record

1948 births
People from Keith, Moray
Scottish biochemists
Scottish trade unionists
Scottish National Party MSPs
Scottish Latter Day Saints
People educated at Keith Grammar School
Alumni of the University of Aberdeen
Scottish National Party councillors
Members of the Scottish Parliament 2003–2007
Members of the Scottish Parliament 2007–2011
Members of the Scottish Parliament 1999–2003
Members of the Scottish Parliament 2011–2016
Members of the Scottish Parliament for Aberdeen constituencies
Ministers of the Scottish Government
2013 deaths
Councillors in Aberdeen